Baek Jin-Kuk (born 31 December 1976) is a Korean former wrestler who competed in the 2004 Summer Olympics.

References

 

1976 births
Living people
South Korean male sport wrestlers
Olympic wrestlers of South Korea
Wrestlers at the 2004 Summer Olympics
Asian Games medalists in wrestling
Wrestlers at the 2002 Asian Games
Wrestlers at the 2006 Asian Games
Medalists at the 2002 Asian Games
Medalists at the 2006 Asian Games
Asian Games gold medalists for South Korea
20th-century South Korean people
21st-century South Korean people